Sublabial administration, literally "under the lip", from Latin, refers to the pharmacological route of administration by which the active substance is placed between the lip and the gingiva (gum). Sublabial administration should not be confused with sublingual administration, which is under the tongue. The frenulum of the tongue may be irritated when in contact with corrosive materials but can be avoided with this route. It is usually used for medications such as glyceryl trinitrate, for example, in angina pectoris.

Upper lip administration 
Some drugs are inactive in the digestive tract, but this can be avoided if held between the upper lip and gum. This prevents the substances from getting swallowed with salivation, as would normally occur between the lower lip and gum, permitting slow release of the drug to prolong the duration of action.

References 

Routes of administration